Savi was the capital of the 17th- and 18th-century African Kingdom of Whydah, in modern Benin.

Savi or SAVI may also refer to:

 Savi, Benin, a town and arrondissement
 Savi language, a Dardic language of Afghanistan
 Savi Technology, a U.S. company
 Stimulator of interferon genes, a protein that in humans is encoded by the TMEM173 gene
 Soil-adjusted vegetation index, a vegetation index used in earth remote sensing

People with the name 
 Gaetano Savi (1769–1844), Italian botanist
 Paolo Savi (1798–1871), Italian geologist and ornithologist, after whom is named:
 Savi's warbler, Locustella luscinioides, a species of bird
 Savi's pipistrelle, Hypsugo savii, a species of bat
 Savi's pine vole, Microtus savii, a species of rodent
 Toomas Savi (born 1942), Estonian politician
 Filippo Savi (born 1987), Italian football player

See also 
 Savy (disambiguation)
 Savvy (disambiguation)

Italian-language surnames